Oscar Lengdén (born 12 May 1992) is a Swedish professional golfer.

Lengdén spent four years and won two NCAA Division titles at Nova Southeastern University in Fort Lauderdale before he returned to Europe and turned professional in 2015. Competing in his native Sweden he won four times in six weeks to earn his place on the Nordic Golf League, where he won twice. He finished third on the 2016 Nordic Golf League ranking to become a Challenge Tour rookie in 2017.

Lengdén made it to the final qualifying stage at the European Tour Qualifying School in 2016 but failed by one stroke to earn a European Tour card. He made a handful of starts on the 2017 European Tour and finished tied for fifth at the D+D Real Czech Masters. The following week he claimed his maiden Challenge Tour victory at the Bridgestone Challenge in September. The event used a modified Stableford scoring system. Lengdén finished birdie-birdie-eagle to gain 9 points on the final three holes and won the tournament by 2 points. His run of form continued when, the next week, he was joint runner-up in the Irish Challenge, after which he rose to 186 on the Official World Golf Ranking.

Professional wins (4)

Challenge Tour wins (2)

Challenge Tour playoff record (0–1)

Nordic Golf League wins (2)

Team appearances
Amateur
European Boys' Team Championship (representing Sweden): 2010

References

External links

Swedish male golfers
European Tour golfers
Nova Southeastern Sharks men's golfers
Sportspeople from Helsingborg
1992 births
Living people